Holy Trinity Church was a now demolished church in the village of Thorpe Thewles, County Durham, England.

It was built in 1848–49 to replace an isolated church on a different site which had been dedicated to Thomas à Becket. The Thomas à Becket church is now in ruins and is recorded in the National Heritage List for England as a designated Grade I listed building.  It is also a scheduled monument.

Holy Trinity Church was designed by the Lancaster architects Sharpe and Paley at an estimated cost of £600, and could seat 175 people.  It measured  by  but by the 1880s it was suffering from decay and damp, and was demolished.

It was replaced on the same site in 1886–87 by the present church, dedicated to St James. This church is a Grade II listed building.

See also
List of works by Sharpe and Paley

References

External links
Ground plan of the church

Churches completed in 1849
19th-century Church of England church buildings
Sharpe and Paley buildings
Former churches in County Durham
Grade II listed buildings in County Durham
1849 establishments in England